Cheick Hussein Dabo (born 7 June, 1994 in Abidjan, Ivory Coast) is an Ivorian footballer who plays for Vitória Guimarães B as a defender.

Football career
On 7 March, 2015, Dabo made his professional debut with Vitória Guimarães B in a 2014–15 Segunda Liga match against Beira-Mar.

References

External links

Stats and profile at LPFP 

1994 births
Living people
Ivorian footballers
Association football defenders
Liga Portugal 2 players
Segunda Divisão players
Vitória S.C. players
Footballers from Abidjan